Tečić (Serbian Cyrillic: Течић) is a village in Central Serbia (Šumadija), in the municipality of Rekovac (Region of Levač), lying at , at the elevation of 210 m. According to the 2002 census, the village had 660 citizens.

External links
 Levac Online
 Article about Tečić
 Pictures from Tečić
 Site about Tečić

Populated places in Pomoravlje District
Šumadija